"Waltz Away Dreaming" is a 1997 song by Irish singer Toby Bourke and British singer George Michael. It was released in May 1997 in the United Kingdom as the lead single to Bourke's 2000 album Room 21. A pop ballad, the song was a top ten hit, charting at number ten on the UK Singles Chart, and staying in the charts for four weeks. It remains as Bourke's only hit.

The single was slightly remixed by Tim Hammill in 1999 and was released as "Waltz Away Dreaming '99" in Europe.

"Waltz Away Dreaming" has not appeared on any of Michael's studio albums. It did eventually appear in 1998 on his greatest hits album Ladies & Gentlemen: The Best of George Michael, but only on the cassette version. A music video was also made for the single.

Critical reception
British magazine Music Week rated the song three out of four, describing it as "a low-key, folksy ballad written by the pair in tribute to George Michael's late mother. With plenty of profile, it could be a hit."

Track listing

 UK CD (Aegean AECD01)
"Waltz Away Dreaming" – 4:44
"Things I Said Tonight" (Live Demo Version) – 4:39

 French CD single (XIII Bis 6400990)
"Waltz Away Dreaming" (New Version) – 4:44
"House of Love"
"Waltz Away Dreaming" (Video Clip)

 UK cassette single (Aegean AEMC01)
A-side
"Waltz Away Dreaming" – 4:44
"Things I Said Tonight" (Live Demo Version) – 4:39

B-side
"Waltz Away Dreaming" – 4:44
"Things I Said Tonight" (Live Demo Version) – 4:39

 Italian 12" The Remixes (Arcade LC-CODE 0160)
A-side
"Waltz Away Dreaming '99" (Mauro Davide Club Remix) – 5:50
"Waltz Away Dreaming '99" (B&A Remix) – 6:40

B-side
"Waltz Away Dreaming '99" (Atm Club Mix) – 5:30
"Waltz Away Dreaming '99" (Soul Sweet) – 4:35

 Dutch, German and Italian CD "Waltz Away Dreaming '99"

"Waltz Away Dreaming '99" – 4:46
"Waltz Away Dreaming" (Original Version) – 4:42
"Sunshine on Saturday" – 3:54
"Love Is Not Faith" – 5:09

 EU CD "Waltz Away Dreaming '99" (CNR 5300346)
"Waltz Away Dreaming '99" – 4:46
"Waltz Away Dreaming" (Original Version) – 4:42

Charts

References

1997 songs
1997 singles
1999 singles
George Michael songs
Songs written by George Michael
Song recordings produced by George Michael
Pop ballads
Virgin Records singles
Male vocal duets